Uthayendram is a town in Vellore district in the Indian state of Tamil Nadu.

Demographics
 India census, Uthayendram had a population of 11,598. Males constitute 49% of the population and females 51%. Uthayendram has an average literacy rate of 67%, higher than the national average of 59.5%: male literacy is 76%, and female literacy is 59%. In Uthayendram, 11% of the population is under 6 years of age.

References

Cities and towns in Vellore district